is a Japanese exploitation film director. He has worked prolifically in the genre of pinku eiga films, which refers to Japanese films that prominently feature nudity or sexual content. His best-known works are the 1992 pink film The Bedroom and the 1996 V-Cinema splatter film Splatter: Naked Blood. He is known for his "sledgehammer" filmmaking style, and using his exploitation career to tackle serious subjects like obsession, alienation, perversion and voyeurism.

He has been likened to Canadian director David Cronenberg due to his penchant for body horror.

Life and career

Satō is a very prolific director, having directed about two dozen films in 1988 and 1989. To date, he has directed more than fifty films dealing with eroticism, sadism, and horror among the lower classes of Japan. He is famous for his "guerilla shooting technique" in which his actors appear on location in public and incorporate unknowing bystanders into the film. One notorious example of this technique can be seen in Widow's Perverted Hell (1991) in which the lead actress, nude and bound in S&M gear, appears in a busy downtown location and begs confused passers-by to help her masturbate. Allmovie comments, "Like Divine's memorable strut through the streets of Baltimore in Pink Flamingos, this scene was shot guerrilla-style, with no planning, and some of the reactions from unsuspecting pedestrians are priceless. Intended as a dark meditation on the unhinging effects of grief, the mondo aspects of its climactic scene makes the rather lackluster Mibojin Hentai Jigoku worth seeing."

Satō's 1987 film Temptation of the Mask was important for several reasons. One of the first gay films produced by a major pink film director, the film also brought together three members of the shitenno for the first time. Takahisa Zeze worked as Satō's assistant director for the film, and through him began hiring future-director Kazuhiro Sano as an actor in his films. Zeze later recalled, "I remember once there was a gay pink film, and Satō wanted to use Sano, so I was the go-between and negotiated with him to appear in it. That's how we all started working together."

Satō's second gay-themed film was Muscle, also known as Mad Ballroom Gala (1988), a tribute to Italian director Pier Paolo Pasolini. For this film, Satō was awarded the grand prize at the Berlin Gay and Lesbian Festival in 1993. From this and later films like Hunters' Sense of Touch (1995), Satō has gained a reputation as one of the few directors who can competently alternate between gay and heterosexual-themed pink films.

Satō's 1990 film, Horse and Woman and Dog, another film featuring Kazuhiro Sano, became a success due to its scandalous scenes involving bestiality between the three characters in the film's title. Another controversial, but highly regarded film from Satō is Promiscuous Wife: Disgraceful Torture (1992), for which the director hired the Paris cannibal, Issei Sagawa (aka Kazumasa Sagawa) to appear in a cameo role.

Famed for the offensiveness of his films, Lolita: Vibrator Torture (1987), dealing with a homeless man who rapes and murders women, is often singled out as Satō's most repulsive film. In his later works, Satō has collaborated with the female pink film writer, Kyoko Godai. While the violence in his films has sometimes been less extreme since this collaboration, the Weissers, in their Japanese Cinema Encyclopedia: The Sex Films call Godai and Satō's work on Uniform  Punishment: Square Peg in Round Hole! (1991) "Perhaps the most mean-spirited satire on film.". The film deals with a religious cult who worships a maniacal young woman who spends her nights hunting the city for people to rape and kill with the help of a male slave. Allmovie judges the film a "perversely entertaining jet-black satire" and a "dark but highly watchable softcore effort."

Yoshiyuki Hayashida, editor of P*G magazine—currently the leading journal on pink film—and founder of the Pink Grand Prix, became a fan of Satō's work and wrote a script using many of Satō's major themes. Satō filmed the script as Uniform Masturbation: Virgin's Underpanties (1992). Though Satō's style seems to have softened somewhat as the 1990s progressed, he was still capable of producing such works as Splatter: Naked Blood (1996), which, Allmovie warns, "contains one of the most appalling scenes in Japanese horror, with a young woman mutilating and eating her own body."

Partial filmography

Notes

Bibliography
 Hunter, Jack. "Abnormal Ward: The Forbidden Visions of Hisayasu Sato" in Andy Black (ed), Necronomicon: The Journal of Horror and Erotic Cinema: Book Two, London: Creation Books, 1999, pp. 30–39.
 
 Seveon, Julien. Le cinema enrage au Japon. France : 1st edition : Sulliver 2006 / 2nd edition : Rouge Profond 2009.  
 Seveon, Julien. USA : "Interview with Hisayasu Sato" in Asian Cult Cinema #34, 1st quarter 2002.

External links
 
 

1959 births
Japanese film directors
Pink film directors
Living people
People from Shizuoka (city)